The Kraków City Council is the governing body of Kraków. The council has forty-three elected members elected every five years in an election by city voters through a secret ballot. The election of City Council and the local head of government, which takes place at the same time, is based on legislation introduced on 20 June 2002.

City Council President

Members of the Kraków City Council

Election results

2018

All 43 seats on the city council were being contested in the 2018 election.

2014
All 43 seats on the city council were being contested in the 2014 election.

2010
All 43 seats on the city council were being contested in the 2010 election.

2006
All 43 seats on the city council were being contested in the 2006 election.

2002
All seats on the city council were being contested in the 2002 election. The number of seats was lowered from 75 to 43.

References

City councils in Poland
Kraków